Jean Baumert (25 July 1902 – 18 January 1968) was a French wrestler. He competed in the Greco-Roman light heavyweight event at the 1924 Summer Olympics.

References

External links
 

1902 births
1968 deaths
Sportspeople from Colmar
People from Alsace-Lorraine
Olympic wrestlers of France
Wrestlers at the 1924 Summer Olympics
French male sport wrestlers